Digest may refer to:

Biology
Digestion of food
Restriction digest

Literature and publications
The Digest, formerly the English and Empire Digest
Digest size magazine format
Digest (Roman law), also known as Pandects, a digest of Roman law

Computer science and electronic security
Digest, a MIME Multipart Subtype
Digest access authentication
Digital Geographic Exchange Standard
Email digest
Message digest or hash algorithm (in cryptography)

Other uses
trade name of the drug Lansoprazole

See also

Publications 
The Literary Digest 
Architectural Digest 
Writer's Digest 
Reader's Digest 
Baseball Digest 
Gun Digest 
Golf Digest 
Consumers Digest 
Inventors Digest 
Football Digest